State Road 659 (SR 659) is a  state highway in Polk County, Florida, that runs from U.S. Route 98 (US 98) and South Combee Road at Eaton Park to SR 33 and Village Lakes Boulevard in far northeast Lakeland via Crystal Lake and Combee Settlement.

History
State Road 659 was originally designated as Florida State Road 33A.

Major intersections

References

External links

FDOT Map of Polk County (Including SR 659)

659
659